Jonasson is a surname of Swedish origin.  Spelled 'Jónasson', it refers to an Icelandic surname, although Canadians of Icelandic descent are likely to spell it with the accent mark. People with the surname Jonasson include:
Einar Jonasson (1887–1935), Canadian politician from Manitoba; provincial legislator
Frank Jonasson (1878–1942), American film actor of the silent-film era
Jonas Jonasson (b. 1961) Swedish writer
Mats Jonasson (b. 1945), Swedish glass designer
Niclas Jonasson (b. 1976), Swedish orienteering champion
Sigtryggur Jonasson (1852–1942), Canadian politician from Manitoba; provincial legislator; leader of the Canadian-Icelandic community
Sven Jonasson (1909–1984), Swedish professional football player
Thomas H. Jonasson (b. 1988), Swedish motorcycle racer
J. E. Jonasson Swedish composer of The Cuckoo Waltz

Surnames